Moreno Valley FC is an American amateur soccer club from Moreno Valley, California, on hiatus from the United Premier Soccer League.

History 
MVFC was founded in 2015 to play in the UPSL, and became champions in their season debut. The club won the United States Adult Soccer Association Region IV Cup in 2016, making them one of four regional champions, nationwide.

MVFC qualified to the 2017 U.S. Open Cup, and defeated Ventura County Fusion before falling to Oklahoma City Energy FC.

UPSL midseason exit

MVFC did not complete the Spring 2017 UPSL season after being eliminated from the Cal South State Cup, and from the second round of the 2017 US Open Cup. San Nicolas FC took their place in the UPSL.

Current season

2017 UPSL Western Conference
Moreno Valley FC currently sits in fourth place, after 11 games played.

2017 USASA Region IV Cup: Cal South Track
Moreno Valley FC is 2016 Defending Champion, and 2017 semifinalist. MVFC fell to fellow UPSL club LA Wolves FC on May 25, 2017, in overtime, by a score of 4–3.

U.S. Open Cup Record
Moreno Valley FC qualified to the 2017 US Open Cup with wins over fellow UPSL clubs Ozzy's Laguna FC, and High Desert Rush FC. MVFC defeated Ventura County Fusion in the first round, and fell to OKC Energy in the second round.

Honors
2017 U.S. Open Cup Entrant, 2nd Round
2017 Cal South State Cup Semifinalist
2016 United States Adult Soccer Region IV Champions
2016 Winter United Premier Soccer League Champions

References

External links

Soccer clubs in Greater Los Angeles
Association football clubs established in 2015
United Premier Soccer League teams
2015 establishments in California